Quaquapitzahuac (died 1417) was the first ruler of the Aztec city of Tlatelolco. His name, which means "Slender Horn", was pronounced  in Classical Nahuatl, and is also spelled Cuacuauhpitzahuac, Cuacuapitzahuac, and Quaquauhpitzahuac.

His nephew was Tecollotzin.

Reign 
Quaquapitzahuac was appointed by his father, Tezozomoc, in 1376 to serve as the first tlatoani of Tlatelolco, thus beginning that city's royal house. Under his rule, Tlatelolcan armies participated in various conquests on behalf of the city of Azcapotzalco, winning the right to receive tribute from the conquered towns in the east of the valley of Mexico.

Family
He was a son of famous Tezozomoc, the Tepanec ruler of Azcapotzalco.

He was a brother of the kings Aculnahuacatl Tzaqualcatl, Tzihuactlayahuallohuatzin, Maxtla, Epcoatl and the queen Ayauhcihuatl.

His wife was called Acxocueitl.

Upon his death in 1417, he was succeeded by his son Tlacateotl. He was also a father of the queens Matlalatzin (wife of Chimalpopoca) and Huacaltzintli (wife of Itzcoatl).

He was a grandfather of the prince Tezozomoc.

References

Tlatoque of Tlatelolco
14th-century monarchs in North America
15th-century monarchs in North America
14th-century indigenous people of the Americas
15th-century indigenous people of the Americas
14th-century births
1417 deaths
14th century in the Aztec civilization
15th century in the Aztec civilization